Saw – The Ride is a steel roller coaster located at Thorpe Park in Surrey, England. Manufactured by Gerstlauer, the Euro-Fighter model opened to the public 14 March 2009 as the steepest freefall roller coaster in the world, with a drop angle of 100 degrees. It is themed to the Saw film franchise, featuring an enclosed dark section and queue theming which makes numerous references to the film series.

History
Thorpe Park announced plans for a new roller coaster on 14 October 2008. Thorpe Park created a dedicated website for the new ride, hyperbolically claiming it would be "the scariest ride in the world." The official press release detailing the park's fourth major roller coaster confirmed a development partnership with Lionsgate and Twisted Pictures, and it claimed Saw would feature "the steepest freefall drop in the world." The press release also revealed that "the world's first ever horror movie-themed rollercoaster" would be marketed under the slogan "Face your Fears."

When SAW - The Ride opened, it was not the steepest rollercoaster in the world - Steel Hawg at Indiana Beach had opened the previous year with a steeper 111° drop. However, unlike Steel Hawg's 111° drop, SAW'''s 100° drop does not have any trim brakes on it; hence, as the drop was 'free' (not constrained by brakes), it was marketed specifically as having 'the world's steepest freefall drop'. This particular accolade was taken by The Monster in 2016.

During construction, the codename "Project Dylan" was used to keep the movie tie in secret. The name 'Dylan' in fact came from the project director's cat, with no actual relevance to the ride. A large section of the Canada Creek Railway had to be rebuilt, affecting a small section of the Samurai queue line. Competition winners and annual pass holders were allowed to attend a preview event, before it opened to the public on March 14, 2009. Saw Alive, a live-action horror maze, opened at the park in 2010 to complement the ride. It caught fire in April 2011 but was repaired over the course of a month. Not much was added for the next few years. The only additions were the addition of props from Saw Alive due to its closure at the end of the 2018 season and brand new dispatch audio in 2021.

In 2019, for the 10th anniversary of the ride's opening, the sign by the ride entrance was repainted, and the live actors were temporarily reintroduced for part of the 2019 season.

A Ford Crown Victoria Police Interceptor is displayed next to the ride.

Ride experienceThis ride features unique ride elements which would be considered spoilers in the description below.The ride station and dark section are set in a building made to resemble an abandoned industrial sawmill. The ride generally dispatches two cars in quick succession, and a digital countdown timer is visible to the riders at the start of the ride. The first car bypasses an initial encounter with Billy, who laughs as the car passes. The second car stops while Billy delivers a brief monologue regarding the experience ahead; this also conceals a block section, ensuring sufficient distance between the cars. The car then approaches two dimly-lit swinging pendulum blades which appear to get closer, before a sudden hidden drop that is almost vertical, seemingly plunging the riders directly into a pit of strobe-lit spikes, which are narrowly avoided. The car runs into a set of brakes, and air blasts then fire out at the riders, imitating the firing of syringes from loaded crossbows, which appear to miss over riders' heads. After another surprise drop, the car turns to the left and enters a bathroom, where it enters a heartline roll above a screaming and heavily bleeding victim of Jigsaw in a pool of blood (intended to vaguely resemble the setup of the first Saw film); at this point, water is sprayed at the riders to imitate blood. The car exits the warehouse, enters another set of brakes and travels towards the  vertical lift hill.

Before entering the lift hill, the car stops in front of two video screens and a digital countdown timer. Billy appears onscreen and Jigsaw's voice is heard saying "Game over". The screens then turn off and Billy's laugh is heard. A bell then rings, and the lift hill engages the car, which gradually accelerates as it ascends. After reaching the top, there is a 100° freefall drop passing under large rotating blades. The car then enters an Immelmann loop, followed by an overbanked turn and an air-time hill. The on-ride photos are taken as the cars rise to the left into a set of brakes. This is followed by a sudden drop leading into a dive loop, and the ride ends with a banked turn into the final brake run. The car makes a turn to the right into the station to be unloaded; as it re-enters the station, Jigsaw's voice is heard congratulating the riders for surviving and saying that they are no longer ungrateful to be alive. 

It was originally possible for riders to purchase a DVD of their ride experience, produced from cameras mounted on the front and back of each car, but the cameras were removed in 2012.

Queue
The entrance is situated at the back of Saw Plaza. The exterior queue line consists of mock razor wire fences and various props that resemble torture elements from the films. Walkie talkie recordings of panicked policemen inside the building are played for guests waiting in line. Loud ambient music is played throughout the area. The queue travels around the back of the warehouse and then into the building itself. Inside, riders walk through a dimly lit corridor, with four shotguns hanging from the ceiling. The guns 'fire' every 90 seconds to give a jump effect. The corridor leads up some stairs past a cage with a trap (the Rack from Saw III). Traveling up the stairs, Billy the Puppet can be seen and heard on TV monitors, at certain times explaining the "rules" of the ride. Above the queue, a body is seen tangled in barbed wire (referencing the first Saw), before the queue goes into the station. Here, mannequin parts are fixed in various small devices or hanging from the walls, and misted windows flash on the wall opposite the queue. In the ride station, a digital countdown timer is visible above the gates.

Once finished, riders exit the cars and walk back down another stairway. The two industrial fans on the exterior of the Saw warehouse are seen on the wall by the exit path. A short video of Billy plays at the end of the stairs. More mannequin parts hang from above, as well as a severed head on a weighing scale (as seen in a poster for Saw IV). Riders then exit the building and pass the Saw Store and Photo Booth.

Closures

On 11 March 2009, the ride was scheduled to be launched by a group of invited celebrities, including the director of Saw II, Saw III and Saw IV'', Darren Lynn Bousman, who posted an account of his experience on his Facebook profile. The ride experienced a delay, a barrier shut-down, and a subsequent stop, blamed by park officials on a computer programming error. An ambulance was called when one woman suffered a panic attack.

Following an incident on The Smiler at Alton Towers on 2 June 2015 that resulted in its closure, Merlin Entertainment announced on 5 June 2015 that they were closing Saw – The Ride and two other roller coasters at Chessington World of Adventures for the "foreseeable future" while safety protocols and procedures were evaluated. The ride eventually reopened on 9 July 2015.

Gallery

References

External links
Saw – The Ride Official Page
Saw – Alive Official Page
Saw – The Ride at Total Thorpe Park

Buildings and structures in Surrey
Roller coasters in the United Kingdom
Roller coasters introduced in 2009
Roller coasters operated by Merlin Entertainments
Ride
Thorpe Park roller coasters
Amusement rides based on film franchises